Polypoetes is a genus of moths of the family Notodontidae. It consists of the following species:
Polypoetes aborta  (Dognin, 1913) 
Polypoetes albicuneata  Dognin, 1910
Polypoetes albiscripta  Dognin, 1903
Polypoetes aniplata  Warren, 1906
Polypoetes approximans  Warren, 1901
Polypoetes aterrima  (Dognin, 1913) 
Polypoetes augustimacula  Dognin, 1902
Polypoetes bifenestra  Miller, 2008
Polypoetes bistellata  Dognin, 1902
Polypoetes circumfumata Warren, 1901
Polypoetes colana  Druce, 1893
Polypoetes copiosa  Miller, 2008
Polypoetes corneola  Miller, 2008
Polypoetes crenulata  Miller, 2008
Polypoetes cuatropuntada  Dognin, 1893
Polypoetes deldon  Druce, 1885
Polypoetes disconnexa  Dognin, 1911
Polypoetes dynastes  Hering, 1925
Polypoetes empheres  (Prout, 1918) 
Polypoetes eriphus  Druce, 1885
Polypoetes etearchus  Druce, 1885
Polypoetes exclamationis  Hering, 1925
Polypoetes exclusa  Hering, 1925
Polypoetes eximia  (Warren, 1909) 
Polypoetes fenestrata  Hering, 1925
Polypoetes forficata  Miller, 2008
Polypoetes fuliginosa  Dognin, 1904
Polypoetes haruspex  Druce, 1885
Polypoetes ineldo  Schaus, 1933
Polypoetes integra  Hering, 1925
Polypoetes intersita  Hering, 1925
Polypoetes jipiro  Dognin, 1893
Polypoetes leuschneri  Miller, 2008
Polypoetes luteivena  (Walker, 1864) 
Polypoetes mara  Hering, 1925
Polypoetes marginifer  Dyar, 1913
Polypoetes nigribasalis  Hering, 1925
Polypoetes nox  Druce, 1909
Polypoetes nubilosa  (Warren, 1900) 
Polypoetes obtusa  (Walker, 1856) 
Polypoetes opaca  (Hering, 1925) 
Polypoetes oteroi  Miller, 2008
Polypoetes pallinervis  (Felder, 1874) 
Polypoetes pellucida  (Dognin, 1910) 
Polypoetes persimilis  (Dognin, 1913) 
Polypoetes picaria  Warren, 1904
Polypoetes prodromus  Hering, 1925
Polypoetes rubribasis  (Hering, 1925) 
Polypoetes rufipuncta  Schaus, 1894
Polypoetes selenia  C. and R. Felder, 1874
Polypoetes semicoerulea  Dognin, 1910
Polypoetes subcandidata  Dognin, 1910
Polypoetes sublucens  Dognin, 1909
Polypoetes suffumosa  Dognin, 1902
Polypoetes sumaco  Miller, 2008
Polypoetes tenebrosa  Warren, 1907
Polypoetes tinalandia  Miller, 2008
Polypoetes trimacula  (Warren, 1904) 
Polypoetes tulipa  Miller, 2008
Polypoetes vidua  Warren, 1909
Polypoetes villia  Druce, 1897
Polypoetes villiodes  (Prout, 1918) 
Polypoetes villiopsis  (Hering, 1925) 
Polypoetes wagneri  Miller, 2008

Notodontidae of South America